Empire is an hour-long Western television series set on a 1960s  ranch in New Mexico, starring Richard Egan, Terry Moore, Ryan O'Neal and Charles Bronson. It ran on NBC from September 25, 1962, to May 14, 1963.  After the initial series of one-hour shows, the series was retitled as Redigo and truncated to half hour episodes, again starring Egan as Redigo. That version only ran for a partial season.
In the UK the series was shown in the London ITV area (Associated-Rediffusion) under the title Big G, from Jun 12th 1963 to Jan 16th 1964.

Episodes

Guest stars
Guest stars who appeared on Empire included:

Inger Stevens
Philip Abbott
Barry Atwater
Barbara Bain
Roy Barcroft
Joanna Barnes
Ed Begley
Diane Brewster
Joyce Bulifant
Walter Burke
James T. Callahan
Lon Chaney, Jr.
Pat Conway
Ray Danton
John Dehner
Lawrence Dobkin
Keir Dullea
Sharon Farrell
Joan Freeman
Leo Gordon

Frank Gorshin
Harold Gould
Dabbs Greer
Virginia Gregg
James Gregory
James Griffith
Joan Hackett
Don C. Harvey
Anne Helm
Clegg Hoyt
Arch Johnson
L. Q. Jones
Richard Jordan
Victor Jory
Gail Kobe
Harvey Korman
Bethel Leslie
Joanne Linville
Ralph Meeker

Roger Mobley
Bill Mumy
Dan O'Herlihy
Dennis Patrick
Ford Rainey
Gilman Rankin
Chris Robinson
Telly Savalas
Karen Steele
Robert J. Stevenson
Harold J. Stone
Frank Sutton 
Ray Teal
Russell Thorson
Tom Tully
John Vivyan
Eddy Waller
William Windom

See also
Redigo
Heartland

References

External links 
 
 

1962 American television series debuts
1964 American television series endings
NBC original programming
1960s Western (genre) television series
Television shows set in New Mexico
Television series by Screen Gems
Television series set in the 1960s